South Dakota Highway 22 (SD 22) is a  state highway in Hamlin and Deuel counties in South Dakota, United States. It connects Hazel and Clear Lake.

SD 22 originally extended from the Wyoming state line, following what is now U.S. Route 212 (US 212). When the US 212 was established, SD 22 was truncated to travel from SD 45 in northern Hand County to SD 41 (current US 281) south of Redfield. This is now SD 26. The current alignment was established in the mid-1930s, with a north–south portion from Hazel to US 212. This last portion was decommissioned in the 1990s.

Route description
SD 22 begins at an intersection with the northern terminus of 1st Street and the southern terminus of Mustang Avenue in the north-central part of Hazel, within the northwestern part of Hamlin County. Here, the roadway continues to the west as Hamlin County Road 181/181st Street. SD 22 travels to the east. Just east of William Street, it crosses over some railroad tracks of BNSF Railway. Just east of 444th Avenue, it travels just south of the Baxter Slough State Public Shooting Area. East of 449th Avenue, it travels through Thomas. the highway then curves to the southeast to travel around the southwestern part of Clear Lake. Just east of 451st Avenue, it curves to the east-northeast. Just west of 452nd Avenue, it curves to the east-southeast. East of 454th Avenue, it travels through the Five Ponds area. It then intersects US 81. The two highways travel concurrently to the south-southeast. Here, the roadway continues to the east as 181st Street. At 183rd Street, SD 22 splits off to the east-northeast. Just east of 458th Avenue, it crosses over the Big Sioux River and then travels just north of Castlewood. An intersection with the northern terminus of 2nd Avenue leads to Castlewood. An intersection with 459th Avenue and the northern terminus of 4th Avenue, which is signed as a "city truck route", leads to a city park. East of 461st Avenue, it crosses over Stray Horse Creek and then curves to the north-northeast. Almost immediately, it curves back to the east. East of 465th Avenue, it has an interchange with Interstate 29 (I-29). While traveling under the Interstate highway, it enters the west-central part of Deuel County.

SD 22 continues to the east through rural areas of the county. East of 475th Avenue, it enters the southern part of Clear Lake. It has an intersection with SD 15. Just after leaving Clear Lake, it crosses over Hidewood Creek. Just to the east of 476th Avenue, it curves to the southeast to travel around the southeastern part of Clear Lake. Just west of Clear Lake Road, it begins to curve to the east-northeast. Just west of 479th Avenue, it curves to the east again. Just west of 485th Avenue, it crosses over Cobb Creek. Just to the east of this intersection is a second crossing of this creek. Just west of 486th Avenue, the highway curves to the east-northeast. Along a curve to the south-southeast, it intersects the southern terminus of SD 101. It crosses over Cobb Creek for a third time and then curves to the south-southwest. Just north of County Road 22A (CR 22A; 478th Avenue), the highway curves back to the east. Just east of 184th Street, it reaches its eastern terminus, at the Minnesota state line. Here, the roadway continues as Minnesota State Highway 68 (MN 68).

SD 22 is not part of the National Highway System, a system of routes determined to be the most important for the nation's economy, mobility and defense.

History

When SD 22 was originally established in the 1920s, its western terminus was at the Wyoming state line. It followed what is now US 212 along this path. When US 212 was established in 1927, SD 22 was shifted onto a new alignment. It traveled from SD 45 in northern Hand County to SD 41 (what is now US 281) south of Redfield. This alignment is now the path of SD 26. The current path of SD 22 was established by 1936, and included a north–south segment from Hazel to US 212. This north–south segment was decommissioned in the 1990s.

Major intersections

Gary spur route

South Dakota Highway 22 Spur (SD 22 Spur) was a spur route of SD 22 that extended from the mainline, at a point south of Gary, and traveled into that city. It was established between 1965 and 1971 and was redesignated as SD 101 in 1975.

See also

 List of state highways in South Dakota

References

External links

 The Unofficial South Dakota Highways Page: Highways 1-30

0022
Transportation in Hamlin County, South Dakota
Transportation in Deuel County, South Dakota